Barinque is a commune of the Pyrénées-Atlantiques department in the Nouvelle-Aquitaine region of south-western France.

The inhabitants of the commune are known as Barinquais or Barinquaises.

Geography
Barinque is located on a steep hill overlooking the Souye valley, some 15 kilometres north-east of Pau and 7 km south-east of Auriac in the Vic-Bihl region. Access to the commune is by the D222 road from Higuères-Souye in the south which goes north through the west of the commune to the village then continues east to join the D43 which forms the south-eastern border of the commune as it goes from Escoubès in the east to Saint-Jammes in the south. There are large areas of forest in the south of the commune and scattered forests in the commune however most of the commune is farmland.

The Luy de France flows from the south forming the entire western border of the commune before continuing north to eventually join the Luy north of Castel-Sarrazin. The Souye river flows from south to north-west through the heart of the commune joining the Luy de France on the western border of the commune. The Ruisseau de Cimpceu rises east of the village and flows north to join the Gabas west of Sévignacq.

Places and Hamlets
Below is a list of places and hamlets in the commune:

 Antoni
 Arnaud
 Artigou
 Auguste
 Barbe
 Barthe
 Bié
 Bourdallé
 Castagnet
 Champrilh
 Charron
 Coulate
 Daguet
 Fisse
 La Gare
 Garimbay
 Gélizé
 Grabette
 Jeanbounat
 Labat
 Laragnou
 Lardas
 Lasalle
 Lauga
 Lavigne (2 places)
 Loudet
 Loustau
 Margotou
 Mariette
 Marque
 Mingenette
 Monge
 Mouchou
 Parjouan
 Pébrocq
 Picou
 Pierrot
 Piot
 Piquet
 Pisseu
 Portaix
 Prétou
 Prince
 Pucheu
 Saubade
 Soubirou
 Toulardet

Toponymy
The commune name in béarnais is Barinco (pronounced Barincou). Michel Grosclaude concluded that the name is of Occitan origin with the meaning "slope towards a ravine", following Dauzat and Rostaing who offered a Gaulish and pre-Gaulish root barr- meaning "height" or "summit" with the suffix -incum.

The following table details the origins of the commune name and other names in the commune.

Sources:
Grosclaude: Toponymic Dictionary of communes, Béarn, 2006 
Raymond: Topographic Dictionary of the Department of Basses-Pyrenees, 1863, on the page numbers indicated in the table. 
EHESS: 

Origins:
Census: Census of Béarn
Reformation: Reformation of Béarn
Barinque: Titles of Barinque

History

Paul Raymond noted on page 21 of his 1863 dictionary that Barinque had a Lay Abbey, vassal of the Viscounts of Béarn.
In 1385 Barinque had 15 fires and depended on the bailiwick of Pau.

Barinque was part of the Barony of Navailles in the Middle Ages.

The commune was part of the Arch-Deaconry of Vic-Bilh which depended on the Bishop of Lescar and Lembeye was the capital.

Barinque appears as Barinque on the 1750 Cassini Map but as Barringue on the 1790 version.

Administration

List of Successive Mayors

Demography
In 2017 the commune had 606 inhabitants.

Culture and heritage

Civil heritage
The commune has a number of buildings and sites that are registered as historical monuments:
A Farmhouse at Saubade (1733)
A Farmhouse at Pierrot (1765)
A Farmhouse at Loudet (19th century)
Houses and Farms (18th-19th century)

Religious heritage

The Parish Church of Saint-Barthélémy (12th century) is registered as an historical monument. The Church contains many items that are registered as historical objects:

The Furniture in the Church
A container for Baptismal water (17th century)
A Collection Plate (19th century)
6 Candlesticks (19th century)
A Chalice (18th century)
2 Processional Banners (19th century)
A Mural Painting: Saints Paul and Peter and 2 Angels (16th century)
A Stoup (19th century)
A secondary Altar of the Virgin with Tabernacle and stand for a Monstrance (18th century)
An Altar Painting: the Martyrdom of Saint Barthélémy (1650)
A Retable (1650)
3 Statuettes: Saint Peter, Saint Paul, and the Virgin with child (1720)
A Tabernacle (1650)
The main Altar and Tomb (18th century)
The main Altar, Tabernacle, and Retable (18th century)
A Stained glass window: Saint John (Bay 2) (1873)
4 Stained glass windows (Bays 3-6) (19th century)
A Capital and recessed Stoup (13th century)

See also
Communes of the Pyrénées-Atlantiques department

References

Communes of Pyrénées-Atlantiques